A Grande Família (English: Big Family) is a Brazilian television comedy, and is one of the most watched primetime shows. The show airs on the Globo Network, and tells the story of a typical lower middle-class family living in a suburb neighborhood of Rio de Janeiro.

The family consists of a working father, Lineu, a housewife and mother, Nenê, their son Tuco, their daughter Bebel, and Bebel's fiancée, Agostinho, a taxi driver portrayed as the typical carioca malandro. The family's grandfather, Floriano, was written out of the story after the death of actor Rogério Cardoso.

Awards and nominations
It has won many different awards, including 7 Extra Awards, 3 Arte e Qualidade, one APCA award and a nomination for an Emmy Award for the role of actor Pedro Cardoso.

References

Lists of awards by television series